Uroš Trifunović (born 5 December 2000) is a Serbian professional basketball player for Partizan Belgrade of the Serbian KLS, the Adriatic League and the EuroLeague.

Early career
Trifunović started to play basketball in his hometown Belgrade, for the Zemun youth selections. In Summer 2015, he joined the Mega Bemax. During the 2017–18 season, he played in Turkey for the junior team of Pınar Karşıyaka, where his father Aleksandar coached the first team.

Professional career
In September 2018, Trifunović joined Partizan. Prior to the 2018–19 season, he was loaned out to Mladost Zemun. On July 4, 2019, he was loaned out to Mega Bemax for the 2019–20 season.
Trifunović played in Mega Bemax in the first two rounds of the ABA League, after which he left the club dissatisfied with the minutes and the role in the team. The loan was officially terminated on October 18, 2019, after which Trifunović returned to Partizan. On April 24, he declared for the 2020 NBA draft. On June 27, 2020, Trifunović signed a four-year contract extension for Partizan. On July 19, 2021, he withdrawn his name from consideration for the 2021 NBA draft.

National team career
Trifunović was a member of the Serbian under-18 team that won the gold medal at the 2018 FIBA Europe Under-18 Championship in Latvia. Over seven tournament games, he averaged 10.0 points, 2.3 rebounds and 4.4 assists per game.

Trifunović was a member of the Serbian under-19 team that finished 7th at the 2019 FIBA Under-19 Basketball World Cup in Heraklion, Greece. Over seven tournament games, he averaged 14.0 points, 2.0 rebounds and 3.1 assists per game.

In February 2020, he received the first invitation for the senior Serbia national team. Coach Igor Kokoškov included him on the list of players for the matches against Finland and Georgia in the qualifications for EuroBasket 2022. Trifunović made his debut for the senior team on February 20, 2020, in an 80–58 win over Finland.

Personal life
His father Aleksandar Trifunović is a professional basketball coach and former player.

References

External links
 Profile at euroleague.net
 Profile at aba-liga.com
 Profile at Eurospects

2000 births
Living people
ABA League players
Basketball players from Belgrade
Basketball League of Serbia players
KK Mega Basket players
KK Mladost Zemun players
KK Partizan players
Point guards
Serbian expatriate basketball people in Turkey
Serbian men's basketball players
Shooting guards